HDMS Brev Drageren (also Brevdrageren) was a Danish let brigger (light brig), launched in 1801. She was one of the many vessels the Danes surrendered to the British after the Battle of Copenhagen in 1807. She was subsequently added to the Royal Danish Navy as HMS Brev Drageren, and was involved in two notable actions while in British service. She was sold in 1825.

Construction and designBrevdrageren was built at Bodenhoffs Plads to a design by F.C.H. Hohlenberg and launched in 1801. She was the name-ship of a two-vessel class, and both she and her sister Fama had distinctive pinched or "pink" sterns, that is, sterns that were rounded rather than the more normal square stern. Another vessel, Fehmern, was built similarly to Brevdrageren and her sister, but was slightly heavier. These vessels were much smaller than the heavy brigs designed for combat and the Danes used them as despatch vessels; Brevdrageren in Danish means "Despatch" or "Letter Carrier".

Her official Danish armament was eight 4-pounder guns and four 12-pounder carronades. Alternatively, she may have carried two 6-pounder guns, and sixteen 12-pounder carronades, since accounts differ.

Danish service
In 1801, together with Søormen, she served as a tender to the naval cadet training ship. In 1802, commanded by Thomas Fasting, she once again served as a tender to the naval cadet training ship and in 1805, under captain F.C. Fisker, was a member of the Danish home squadron.

British service
The Royal Navy surveyed Brev Drageren and refitted her at Chatham.  She was commissioned under Lieutenant J. S. A. Dennis. In 1809 the Navy considered renaming her Cockatrice but that plan fell through. Command then passed to a Lieutenant Charles C. Dobson, who was later court martialed for an "unnatural crime" committed in September 1809 while in command.

Together they captured property at Harlinger Zyl, together with a Danish privateer and a mutt in ballast.

Escape from three Danish Brigs, 1811
The Danes had 54 guns and 480 men, against the British 22 guns and 107 men; outnumbered and outgunned, the British vessels took flight.

The next day Brev Drageren unsuccessfully re-engaged first one and then two of the brigs. In the inconclusive engagement each British vessel sustained one man killed, and Brev Drageren also had three wounded. In the second day’s fight, Algerine sent a boat and sweeps to Brev Drageren, which helped her escape the Danes, though not until after her crew had rowed for 30 hours. The Danes reported capturing two cargo ships (galleases) that Brev Drageren had been escorting.

Capture of Prizes off the Ems, 1812
During 1812 Brev Drageren was stationed at Heligoland, which the British had captured in 1807. Here she made several minor captures. One capture was of a French privateer lugger and another was an armed customs-house vessel that Brev Drageren cut out from Delfzijl at the mouth of the river Ems.

Between 18 and 25 March she captured  Jeune Nicholas, Trois Freres, Vrow Johanna, Deux Freres, and the cargo Gerrit Peter Kripisz. Then on 17 April Brev Drageren was in company with  when they captured the Noysonheid. Nightingale and Exertion captured the Deux Freres, Vrow, Anna Jacobs, and Deux Freres (2), on 3 June.

On 9 March 1813, Brev Drageren was in company with  when they captured the Danish sloop Enigheiden.

Operations in the Elbe, 1813
On 14 March 1813 Lieutenant Francis Banks, of the gun-brig Blazer, who commanded the small British force stationed off the island of Heligoland, received information that the Russian Army had entered Hamburg and that the French at Cuxhaven were in some distress. He took Brev Drageren and proceeded to the river Elbe to intercept any fleeing French vessels. Early in the morning he found two abandoned gun-vessels that he destroyed. Then the British found that the French were destroying their flotilla of 20 large gun schuyts. The next day, by invitation from the shore, Banks landed with 32 troops that he had embarked at Heligoland and took possession of the batteries of Cuxhaven. On 17 March he agreed a treaty with the civil authorities that the British flag should be hoisted in conjunction with the colours of Hamburg. The Russians agreed that they would deliver all the military stores they captured to the two British vessels.Brev Drageren and Blazer shared in the prize money for the Ever Pascal, Deux Freres, Vrow Elizabeth, and stores at Cuxhaven and St. Cricq that they captured on 17 March.

On 21 March 1813, Devon took eight men and his 12-year-old brother, Midshipman Frederick Devon, in Brev Dragerens gig. William Dunbar, Master of Blazer, took 11 men in Blazers cutter. Together the two boats went up river in search of a privateer reported to be in the area. Off the Danish port of Brunsbuttel they sighted two boats, one of which hailed them, ran up Danish colours and opened fire, fortunately over the heads of the British. Devon boarded the gunboat in the smoke of her second broadside, and possibly the explosion of some cartridges on her deck, and captured her. Blazers cutter came up and together the British sailors succeeded in imprisoning the Danish crew below deck. The gunboat turned out to be the Jonge-Troutman. She was under the command of Lieutenant Lutkin, had a crew of 25 men and carried two 18-pounders and three 12-pounders. Dunbar and the cutter then turned their attention to the second gunboat, the Liebe, and captured her too. She was under the command of Lieutenant Writt and had the same establishment as the Jonge-Troutman. The British suffered no casualties and the Danes suffered two wounded.

Admiral Young, the commander-in-chief of the British navy in the area, wrote to Devon, asking him to convey to his men the Admiralty's approbations of their conduct. He acknowledged that "gun-boats make but bad prizes" and therefore pledged that his share of any prize money should be distributed to the crews of the boats. Prize money was paid in June 1815.

In 1847 the Admiralty issued the Naval General Service Medal with clasp "21 March Boat Service 1813" to all surviving claimants of the action. There were three claimants. Frederick Devon was one. The other two went to Thomas Davies, then Assistant Surgeon of Brev Drageren and James Whiteman, then a Private in the Royal Marines, stationed on Blazer.

On 4 May Devon received a promotion to commander. Brev Drageren was re-rated as a sloop-of-war so that he could continue in command.

Operations in the Ems, 1813
Then on 10 July 1813 Brev Drageren was part of a squadron that captured eight small vessels in the Elbe and Weser.

In August Brev Drageren was in company with  when they captured the Danish droits Haabet and Evers, No. 73 and 123, on the 13th and 14th.

In October 1813 Captain Arthur Farquhar, of the 18-pounder 36-gun frigate Desiree, arrived at Heligoland to assume command of the British naval forces there, including Brev Drageren. Brev Drageren, together with two gun-vessels, blockaded Delfzijl, which the French had fortified, by anchoring just outside the range of the French batteries. In this way she contained 17 armed vessels in the port. Devon also assisted in repelling numerous French sorties. Nevertheless, the French held out until the Allies occupied Paris in April 1814. During this period, Brev Drageren captured Enigheid on 27 October.

Devon came into conflict with the Prussian authorities when he prevented them from seizing spars in the custody of a British government agent. This resulted in Brev Drageren being recalled to England in July, though no blame attached to Devon.

Fate
Being unfit for further service, Brev Drageren was hulked as a tender in 1815. On 6 January 1817 the Thames River police took her over for use as a depot. In July 1818 she became a prison ship and served in that capacity until 1820, when she became an Army depot ship. On 24 September 1825 the Navy listed her as available for sale. On 13 October 1825 Joshua Crystall bought Brev Drageren for breaking up.

Notes

Citations

References
James, William (1837) The Naval History of Great Britain from the declaration of war by France in February 1793 to the accession of George IV in January 1820: with an account of the origin and progressive increase of the British Navy (New edition in Six volumes). (London: R. Bentley).
Royal Danish Naval Museum - List of Ships 
O’Byrne, William R. (1849) A naval biographical dictionary: comprising the life and services of every living officer in Her Majesty's navy, from the rank of admiral of the fleet to that of lieutenant, inclusive. (London: J. Murray), vol. 1.
Tancred, George and John Murray, Colonel of Polmaise (1891) Historical record of medals and honorary distinctions conferred on the British Navy, Army and auxiliary forces from the earliest period. London.
T. A. Topsøe-Jensen og Emil Marquard (1935) “Officerer i den dansk-norske Søetat 1660-1814 og den danske Søetat 1814-1932“. (Danish Naval Officers) Two volumes. Download here.
 Wandel, C.F. (1915) Søkrigen i de dansk-norske Farvande 1807-14. (In Danish)

External links
Phillips, Michael - Ships of the Old Navy - Brevdrageren'' (1807).
 Source

Brigs of the Royal Dano-Norwegian Navy
Ships designed by Frantz Hohlenberg
Gunvessels of the Royal Navy
1801 ships
Ships built in Copenhagen
Brigs of the Royal Navy
Captured ships